Louis Tristán (born 1 May 1984 in Lima) is a Peruvian long jumper. His personal best jump is 8.09 metres, achieved in October 2006 in Tunja.

He competed at the 2004 World Indoor Championships, the 2006 World Indoor Championships, the 2007 World Championships and the 2008 Olympic Games without reaching the final.

Achievements

References

1984 births
Living people
Peruvian male long jumpers
Athletes (track and field) at the 2007 Pan American Games
Pan American Games competitors for Peru
Athletes (track and field) at the 2008 Summer Olympics
Olympic athletes of Peru
Sportspeople from Lima
South American Games silver medalists for Peru
South American Games medalists in athletics
Competitors at the 2006 South American Games
21st-century Peruvian people